Leslie-Anne Huff (born August 25, 1984) is an American actress.

Life and education
Huff was born and raised in the San Fernando Valley. She was born to an American father and a Filipino mother.

She attended the University of California, Berkeley. She was highly involved with the Filipino community and co-produced the yearly Pilipino Cultural Night show.

Career
Her career began in 2006 with a role in the television series CSI: NY. She has made guest appearances in several television series, including roles in NCIS, Bones, Days of Our Lives, Chuck, Greek and The Suite Life on Deck.

In 2008, she was cast to star in the film Strawberry Cliff, opposite Hong Kong singer Eason Chan. In 2009, she starred in the Disney Channel's first original web series, Mackenzie Falls, a stand-alone spin-off of Sonny with a Chance. In 2011, she was cast in the film Cowgirls n' Angels, starring James Cromwell, Bailee Madison, Jackson Rathbone, Dora Madison Burge, and Kathleen Rose Perkins.

In 2013, she was cast in Cowgirls 'n Angels: Dakota's Summer, the sequel to Cowgirls 'n Angels opposite Keith Carradine, Haley Ramm, Emily Bett Rickards, and Jade Pettyjohn. In 2016, Leslie became a recurring character on the seventh season of the American supernatural television series, The Vampire Diaries, as a vampire huntress named Rayna Cruz.

Filmography

Film

Television

Web

Philanthropy
In 2005, Huff co-founded the non-profit Kamay at Puso (which means "Hand and Heart" in Tagalog).

In 2010, she appeared in a charity performance of The Vagina Monologues at the Aratani Theater of the Japanese American Cultural & Community Center in Los Angeles, along with Lea Salonga, Tia Carrere, and Tamlyn Tomita.

References

External links

1984 births
21st-century American actresses
Actresses from California
American film actresses
American people of English descent
American actresses of Filipino descent
American television actresses
Living people
People from the San Fernando Valley